Navvuthu Bathakalira is a 2001 Indian Telugu-language drama film, starring J. D. Chakravarthy and Malavika. It is a remake of Tamil film Eazhaiyin Sirippil.

Cast
 J. D. Chakravarthy as Ganesh
 Malavika as Dr Sandhya
 Deepti as Jayamma
 Uma as Sarala
 Asha Saini
 Giri Babu
 Kaka Krishna Murthy
 Mallikarjuna Rao
 Sudhakar
 Babu Mohan
 Achyuth as doctor
 Chinna
 Rajitha

Soundtrack

The Music Was Composed By Devi Sri Prasad and Released by Aditya Music. All songs were written by Sirivennela Seetharama Sastry

References

External links
 

2001 films
Telugu remakes of Tamil films
2000s Telugu-language films
Films directed by Kodi Ramakrishna
Films scored by Devi Sri Prasad